Artur Tamagnini de Sousa Barbosa (1880 – 1940) was a colonial administrator who three times held the post of Governor of Macao. He married poet Maria Ana Acciaioli Tamagnini and died during his third term as governor of the former Portuguese colony of Macao. He began his first term in 1918.

His third term was much more difficult to perform than the other two because in the latter term he had to prepare Macau to face World War II and negotiate with the Japanese to respect the neutrality of this small Portuguese colony. This difficult work was later transferred to Gabriel Maurício Teixeira, Governor of Macao from 1940 to 1947. His collaboration is found in the Gazette of the Colonies (1924–1926).

References 

1880s births
1940 deaths
Governors of Macau
Portuguese people of Italian descent
People from Lisbon